Middlesbrough is a parliamentary constituency in the United Kingdom, recreated in 1974, and represented since 2012 in the House of Commons of the UK Parliament by Andy McDonald from the Labour Party.  An earlier version of the seat existed between 1868 and 1918.

History
First creation
Parliament created this seat under the Representation of the People Act 1867 for the general election the next year, however the population expanded so was split into east/west areas in 1918.  From 1950 until 1974, given intervening expansion of suburbs across the country, the Metropolitan Borough of Thornaby closer to Stockton on Tees was included in the Middlesbrough West constituency.  Thornaby was enveloped into Teesside County Borough from 1974 and has not been part of the associated seats otherwise.

Second creation – current
The seat was recreated on similar boundaries to those which existed immediately before 1918.

Results of the winning party
The 2015 result made the seat the 36-safest of Labour's 232 seats by percentage of majority.

Since the constituency's re-creation in 1974, Middlesbrough has elected the Labour Party's candidate as its MP. In areas formerly part of Middlesbrough East, the MP has been Labour since 1950.

Middlesbrough West took in rural and semi-rural areas outside the borough to the west, and was a marginal seat passing three times between the two largest parties after the Second World War, but a Liberal stronghold from 1918 until 1945; former soldier and iron and steel merchant Trevelyan Thomson ran unopposed at the polls for re-election in 1924.

Opposition parties
The 2012 by-election and 2015 general election saw UKIP finish second. The Liberal Democrats fielded second-placed candidates in 2005 and 2010.  The Conservatives did in all elections between the seat's revival and 2001, and returned to second place in 2017.  The Green Party outpolled the Liberal Democrats in 2015 in a field of five parties' candidates standing — the two parties failed to achieve 5% of votes cast leading them to forfeit their deposits.

Turnout
Turnout has ranged between 70.1% in 1987 and 48.8% in 2005.

Boundaries 

1868–1885: The township of Linthorpe, and so much of the townships of Middlesbrough, Ormesby, and Eston as lie to the north of the road leading from Eston towards Yarm.

1885–1918: The existing parliamentary borough, and so much of the municipal borough of Middlesbrough as was not already included in the parliamentary borough.

1974–1983: The County Borough of Teesside wards of Berwick Hills, Marton, North Ormesby, St Hilda's, Thorntree, and Tollesby.

1983–1997: The Borough of Middlesbrough wards of Acklam, Beckfield, Beechwood, Berwick Hills, Gresham, Grove Hill, Kirby, Linthorpe, North Ormesby, Pallister, Park, St Hilda's, Southfield, Thorntree, and Westbourne.

1997–2010: The Borough of Middlesbrough wards of Acklam, Ayresome, Beckfield, Beechwood, Berwick Hills, Brookfield, Gresham, Grove Hill, Kader, Kirby, Linthorpe, North Ormesby, Pallister, Park, St Hilda's, Southfield, Thorntree, and Westbourne.

2010–present: The Borough of Middlesbrough wards of Acklam, Ayresome, Beckfield, Beechwood, Brookfield, Clairville, Gresham, Kader, Grove Hill, Linthorpe, Middlehaven, North Ormesby and Brambles Farm, Pallister Park, Thorntree, and University.

The boundaries of the constituency are loosely based on the pre-1968 County Borough of Middlesbrough boundaries, which is now defined as the Borough (or Town) of Middlesbrough; the exclusions are its Easterside and Park End Wards, instead in Middlesbrough South and East Cleveland.

Constituency profile
The constituency is mostly the urban city itself, largely in the sunset of its once world-leading steelmaking output. It suffers high unemployment and its adult population has mostly a low income; however, with modern advanced engineering, design and tourism, the city forms with nearby Redcar a bellwether for the North East region's economy firmly in the British forefront of a determined return to increasing national output. In November 2012, male and female unemployment (based on the more up-to-date claimant statistics) placed Middlesbrough topmost of 29 constituencies in the region, well ahead for example the City of Durham at the bottom of the list, with just 3.4% claimants whereas this area had 9.4% claimants.

In terms of housing stock, the authority is one of few authorities to see the proportion of detached and semi-detached homes increase (to 13.6% and 39.9%), in this instance this was coupled with a similar rise in flats to 11.9%, all at a loss to the share of terraced properties, down 4.7%.

2010 general election

The film ToryBoy The Movie followed the election, directed by and starring John Walsh who documented how he became a candidate for the Conservative Party in Middlesbrough, challenging the sitting MP, Stuart Bell. In 2011, Neil Macfarlane, in a report for local newspaper Teesside Gazette, asked "Are Teessiders getting enough from Sir Stuart Bell?" when he failed to answer over one hundred telephone calls made to his constituency office over a three-month period. The Gazette story was picked up by national newspapers. The Independent asked "is Sir Stuart Bell Britain's laziest MP?" The Guardian fact-checked the "laziest MP" claims and found that was false. The Labour Party said it was looking into the allegations.

Members of Parliament

MPs 1868–1918

MPs since 1974

Elections

Elections in the 2010s

Elections in the 2000s

Elections in the 1990s

Elections in the 1980s

Elections in the 1970s

Elections in the 1910s
General Election 1914–15:

A General Election was required to take place before the end of 1915. The political parties had been making preparations for an election to take place and by the July 1914, the following candidates had been selected; 
Liberal:Penry Williams
Unionist:

Elections in the 1900s

Elections in the 1890s

Elections in the 1880s

Elections in the 1870s

 Caused by Bolckow's death.

Elections in the 1860s

See also 
 List of parliamentary constituencies in Cleveland
 History of parliamentary constituencies and boundaries in Cleveland

Notes

References

Sources

Parliamentary constituencies in North East England
Constituencies of the Parliament of the United Kingdom established in 1868
Constituencies of the Parliament of the United Kingdom disestablished in 1918
Constituencies of the Parliament of the United Kingdom established in 1974
Politics of Middlesbrough